Super Skweek is a puzzle game developed and published by the French company Loriciel. The game was released on multiple platforms in the early 1990s as a follow-up to 1989's Skweek (released as Slider in 1991 in the United States).

Gameplay

The player plays the Super Skweek, an orange-furred creature of unknown origin. Under the command of the King, the player has to move over blue tiles in order to repaint them pink, fighting off the monster invasion in doing so. There are five islands, each consisting of 50 levels.

Some levels contain various monsters roaming around, and certain special tiles such as slippery tiles, explosive tiles, floating tiles and tiles which move the player in a certain direction. There are also coins to collect in order to buy prizes at the shop such as bombs or other improved powers.

Reception
For the Atari Lynx version of the game French magazine Consoles Plus gave a score of 97%. On atariarchives.org Robert Jung gave the game a score of 7.5 out of 10. For the Amiga version Amiga Action gave Super Skweek 82%.

Legacy
Super Skweek was rereleased in 2013 for iOS.

References

External links
Skweek for iOS
Super Skweek at Atari Mania
Super Skweek at Lemon Amiga
Play Super Skweek Online
Laurent Arditi's web page

1991 video games
Amiga games
Amstrad CPC games
Atari Lynx games
Atari ST games
Game Gear games
IOS games
Multiplayer and single-player video games
Puzzle video games
TurboGrafx-16 games
U.S. Gold games
Video games developed in France
Virtual Studio games